Garden of Chaos is a heavy metal album released in 2007 by Rob Rock.  It is his fourth solo release.

Track listing 
 "Garden of Chaos" (3:49)
 "Satan's Playground" (4:37)
 "Savior's Call" (3:46)
 "This Time Is the Last Time" (4:46)
 "Only a Matter of Time" (4:24)
 "Spirit in the Sky" (4:07)
 "Metal Breed" (3:58)
 "Millennial Reign" (4:30)
 "Unconditional" (4:57)
 "Ride the Wind" (3:49)
 "Ode to Alexander" (3:19)

Credits
 Rob Rock - lead and backing vocals
 Liza Shekhter - backing vocals and keyboards
 Carl Johan Grimmark - guitars
 Mistheria - keyboards
 Andreas Olsson - bass
 Andreas Johansson - drums
 Roy Z - guitars, bass
 Gus G. - Guitar Solo on "Ride the Wind"
 Bob Rossi - guitar solo on "Metal Breed"
 Peter Hallgren - Guitar Solos on "Savior's Call" and "Millennial Reign"
 Bobby Jarzombek - Drums on "Ride the Wind" and "This Time is the Last Time"

References

2007 albums
Rob Rock albums
AFM Records albums
Candlelight Records albums
Albums produced by Roy Z